There are at least 266 named lakes and reservoirs in Valley County, Montana.

Lakes
 Todd Lakes, el.

Reservoirs
 Magruder Reservoir, el. 
 Mahan and Hoyt Reservoir, el. 
 Mail Reservoir, el. 
 Mary Black Reservoir, el. 
 Maverick Reservoir, el. 
 Mc Kee Reservoir, el. 
 McCuin Reservoir, el. 
 McIntyre Reservoir, el. 
 Middle Reservoir, el. 
 Moccasin Reservoir, el. 
 Mosquito Reservoir, el. 
 Mud Run Reservoir, el. 
 Neil Reservoir, el. 
 Nelsons Reservoir, el. 
 Newberry Flat Reservoir, el. 
 Newton Reservoir, el. 
 North Beaver Reservoir, el. 
 O'Juel Lake, el. 
 Ola Reservoir, el. 
 Old Dog Creek Reservoir, el. 
 Olson Reservoir, el. 
 Paul Reservoir, el. 
 Pearson Reservoir, el. 
 Pines Reservoir, el. 
 Pippin Reservoir, el. 
 Post Reservoir, el. 
 Prairie Reservoir, el. 
 Quick Reservoir, el. 
 Rain Reservoir, el. 
 Rain Reservoir, el. 
 Reservoir Number 14, el. 
 Reservoir Number D-Seven, el. 
 Reservoir Number Four, el. 
 Reservoir Number One Hundred Forty-eight, el. 
 Reservoir Number One Hundred Forty-five, el. 
 Reservoir Number One Hundred Forty-seven, el. 
 Reservoir Number One Hundred Sixty-eight, el. 
 Reservoir Number Twenty-eight, el. 
 Rinnie Reservoir, el. 
 Road Reservoir, el. 
 Robber Reservoir, el. 
 Robin Reservoir, el. 
 Ruby Reservoir, el. 
 Ruins Reservoir, el. 
 Rustler Reservoir, el. 
 Sage Hen Reservoir, el. 
 Sage Hen Reservoir, el. 
 Sage Hen Reservoir Number Two, el. 
 Salty Glen Reservoir, el. 
 Script Reservoir, el. 
 Seagull Reservoir, el. 
 Seventeen Reservoir, el. 
 Seventh Reservoir, el. 
 Short Creek Reservoir, el. 
 Short Creek Reservoir, el. 
 Skeeter Detention Reservoir, el. 
 Skull Reservoir, el. 
 Snow Blind Reservoir, el. 
 Somers Reservoir, el. 
 Soufly Reservoir, el. 
 South Beaver Reservoir, el. 
 Stebley Reservoir, el. 
 Stockman Reservoir, el. 
 Structure Number 143 Reservoir, el. 
 Suburban Reservoir, el. 
 Sunfish Reservoir, el. 
 Swift Reservoir, el. 
 T C Drop Dam Reservoir, el. 
 Target Detention Reservoir, el. 
 Target Reservoir, el. 
 Think Reservoir, el. 
 Three Trees Reservoir, el. 
 Thunderhead Pit Reservoir, el. 
 Tiger Reservoir, el. 
 Timber Reservoir, el. 
 Time Reservoir, el. 
 Tiney Pit Reservoir, el. 
 Todd Lake, el. 
 Tomahawk Detention Reservoir, el. 
 Trail Reservoir, el. 
 Trailerhouse Reservoir, el. 
 Trapper Reservoir, el. 
 Tree Reservoir, el. 
 Triple Crossing Reservoir, el. 
 Trish Reservoir, el. 
 Tuna Reservoir, el. 
 Twin Forks Reservoir, el. 
 Two Butte Reservoir, el. 
 Two Forks Reservoir, el. 
 Two Reservoir, el. 
 Two Tree Reservoir, el. 
 ULT Reservoir, el. 
 Uphans Reservoir, el. 
 Upper Lone Tree Reservoir, el. 
 Valley Reservoir, el. 
 Vic Reservoir, el. 
 VR 33 Reservoir, el. 
 VR 44 Reservoir, el. 
 VR 78 Reservoir, el. 
 VR-105 Reservoir, el. 
 VR-167 Reservoir, el. 
 VR-2 Reservoir, el. 
 VR-80 Reservoir, el. 
 Wagon Top Reservoir, el. 
 Waste Reservoir, el. 
 White Rock Reservoir, el. 
 Whitetail Reservoir, el. 
 Wilderness Reservoir, el. 
 Wilderness Reservoir, el. 
 Willow Bunch Reservoir, el. 
 Willow Creek Flat Reservoir, el. 
 Willow Flat Reservoir, el. 
 Wilson Reservoir, el. 
 Winter Day Reservoir, el. 
 York Reservoir, el. 
 Your Name Reservoir, el.

See also
 List of lakes in Montana

Notes

Bodies of water of Valley County, Montana
ValleyM-Z